Brazil's overall recycling rate is 1%, according to Waste Atlas, but differs a lot from city to city. Brazil has no structured municipal recycling programs. Only 6.4% Brazilian Municipalities have official waste recycling programs. The recovery of recyclable material is largely left to waste pickers, who earn a living by collecting recyclables and selling them to private recycling companies.

Main Leader
Businesses in Brazil are taking a lead role in organizing recycling collection in the country's major cities. In 1992, private companies from various areas (a.k.a. "heavy polluting companies") established the Brazilian Business Commitment for Recycling (CEMPRE), a nonprofit organization work for the promotion of recycling within the scope of comprehensive waste management as an initiative to build a better environmental image for their associates. CEMPRE tries to increase the community's awareness of recycling and other solid waste issues through publications, technical research, seminars, and databases.

Waste pickers

The collection of recyclable material in Brazil is largely from waste pickers. Waste picking activities are supported by government. In Brazil, waste picking is now recognized as an occupation, and organized waste pickers are seen as legitimate stakeholders who can voice their opinions at the local, state, and national levels.

A national program, named Integrated Solid Waste and Carbon Finance Project, is developing strategies for incorporating waste pickers into local waste management systems. Organizing waste picking activities into recycling cooperatives has been one of CEMPRE's main activities as well.

Materials

In Brazil, the main materials for reprocessing are aluminum, steel, glass, paper and plastics. They also recycle batteries, cooking oil, laminated material, refrigerators and so on. The results of aluminum recycling are the most significant.

Paper
In 2006, Brazil recycled 3.9 million tons, or 45 percent, of the paper materials produced that year. Taking into consideration only the paper used in packaging, the recycling rate is even higher at 70 percent. In Brazil, industries consume 2.8 million tonnes of recycled paper. The paper recycling amount in Brazil varies greatly from area to area. In the south and southeast area, rates of recycling are high, at 64% and 44% respectively; whereas it is 16% in other areas.

Aluminum Cans
In 2005, the country managed to recycle an incredible 96 percent of the aluminum cans sold that year – almost 9.4 million cans. Aluminum is collected and stored by a chain of about 2,000 scrap collectors. 50% of the collectors are industries, and the others are supermarkets, schools, companies, and charitable entities.

Steel Cans
In Brazil, just 5% of drink cans are made of steel. In 2007, Brazil’s recycling rate for steel cans was 49 percent. The total fraction of steel recycled in Brazil, including steel from old cars, household electronics, and building waste, is estimated to be 70%.

Tires

57% of the 260,000 tonnes of used tires estimated to be thrown away each year in Brazil were sent to cement ovens in Brazil. In Brazil, used tires are applied to make artificial reefs in the sea, to increase fisheries production. Energy can be recovered by burning the tires in controlled ovens, because each tire contains the energy of 9.4 liters of petroleum oil.

Plastic
An average of 17.5% of all rigid and film plastic is recycled each year in Brazil. 60% of the recycled plastic comes from industrial residue and 40% from urban refuse.

Refrigerator
There is a comprehensive refrigerator recycling program in Brazil. They recycle refrigerators and freezers in order to reduce potential global warming, because they contain chlorofluorocarbons (CFCs), which are ozone layer depleting gases with extremely high global warming potential (GWP).

References

External links